United Income, Inc. is an online investment management and financial planning company located in Washington D.C. The company was founded in September 2016 by  Matt Fellowes, an American entrepreneur and former Brookings Institution scholar. It launched its services in September 2017. On July 31, 2019, Capital One acquired United Income. This acquisition builds on a 2018 investment Capital One made in United Income.

Background
United Income is an investment firm that offers a "hybrid service" with access to human advisors who rely on financial software in their decision making process.  The company deploys sets of statistics on investment performance, retiree spending, longevity, and other factors to simulate potential financial outcomes. Its "unified consumer finance system" recommends a retirement strategy based on millions of simulations for each individual. Its purpose is to offer retirees financial advice that is different from traditional financial planning software.

United Income's team of policy experts includes former U.S. Social Security Administration Director of the Office of Policy Evaluation and Modeling (OPEM) Howard Iams; former Bureau of Labor Statistics (BLS) commissioner Erica Groshen; former Deputy Assistant Secretary of the Treasury, Office of Tax Policy Adam Looney; former Deputy Assistant Secretary of the Treasury, Office of Retirement and Health Policy Mark Iwry; and Steve Utkus, Head of the Vanguard Center for Investor Research.

The company attracted $200 million in assets under management during its beta stage.  
United Income raised $5.8 million in seed funding in 2016. According to the U.S. Securities and Exchange Commission (SEC) filings, Morningstar, Inc. and Fellowes, each own between 25% and 50% of United Income. A smaller stake is owned by the Omidyar Network, funded by billionaire eBay founder Pierre Omidyar.

According to a study conducted by United Income, retirees spend less because they are pessimistic about their future financial health.

References

Financial technology companies
Investment management companies of the United States
Financial services companies of the United States
Financial services companies established in 2017
Privately held companies based in Washington, D.C.
American companies established in 2016